BeBe & CeCe Winans are an American gospel music brother and sister duo. BeBe and CeCe Winans are the seventh and eighth of the Winans family's ten children, most of whom have had gospel music careers. Together, they have received several awards, including three Grammys.

Music career
While BeBe and CeCe were in high school, four of their elder brothers formed the successful gospel group The Winans. Initially known as The Winans Part II, BeBe and CeCe first appeared in the public eye when they debuted in 1982 as part of the singing group The PTL Singers on the Christian television show The PTL Club. They were introduced by Jim Bakker, and recorded their first album Lord Lift Us Up as a duo for PTL Records.

Self-titled debut 
BeBe and CeCe left the PTL Singers in 1987 to pursue a musical career and that same year, Sparrow Records offered the two siblings a Gospel recording contract. Their mainstream debut release was the self-titled album BeBe & CeCe Winans. It was produced by Keith Thomas, who would go on to produce Amy Grant and Vanessa L. Williams. The debut record gave them their first R&B hit, "I.O.U. Me", which topped R&B and inspirational charts and generated Grammy nominations, and Dove and Stellar Awards. CeCe also earned a Grammy for "Best Soul Gospel Performance, Female" for the song "For Always."

They were one of the first African American artists to receive significant airplay on contemporary Christian music radio stations and the second African American artists to receive the Dove Award in the Group of the Year category.

Heaven
With the release of their second LP Heaven, they remained steadily popular with R&B audiences, spawning 3 R&B hit singles including two No. 1 singles.  The pair became the first Gospel artists to see their album reach No. 1 on the Billboard sales charts in 1988. The title track also reached No. 12 on the Billboard R&B singles chart.

Other hits from the album included "Lost Without You" and "Celebrate New Life," one of two album tracks featuring superstar and family friend Whitney Houston.

The album reached the R&B Top Ten, went to No. 95 on the Pop Charts and was certified Gold.

Different Lifestyles
The release of their 1991 album Different Lifestyles brought their biggest success to date. It featured the singles "Addictive Love" and a cover of The Staple Singers' "I'll Take You There" featuring Mavis Staples. Both singles topped the R&B chart. Rapper MC Hammer was featured on the single "The Blood" at the height of his career. In 1992, the song peaked at No. 8 on Billboard's Christian Adult Contemporary chart.

First Christmas
A holiday release titled First Christmas followed in 1993. This album showcased BeBe's production skills and led to him doing production work with Whitney Houston on the soundtrack for the movie The Bodyguard as well as production and writing music for artists such as Gladys Knight, Bobby Brown, The Clark Sisters and his younger sisters Angie and Debbie Winans.

Relationships
1994 saw the release of their studio album Relationships, featuring the notable singles "If Anything Ever Happened To You," "Love of My Life," and "Stay With Me." This album conveyed a more personal approach, in CeCe's words: "A lot of people think we're supposed to be perfect, but we're people too, we go through hurt [and] pain. We get songs through experiences and as we reveal these things, people are touched."

Still
In 2009, Still was BeBe & CeCe's first album in more than 15 years.  Premiering 12 new songs, the album's lead single was "Close to You". The album won two Grammy Awards: Best Gospel Performance (the song "Grace") and Best Gospel R&B Album.

Awards and honors
As a duo, BeBe and CeCe Winans' accolades include three Grammy Awards, nine Dove Awards, two NAACP Image awards, two Soul Train Music Awards, numerous Stellar Awards, three Gold albums, and one Platinum album.

Grammy Awards
1991: Best Contemporary Soul Gospel Album – Different Lifestyles
2010: Best Gospel Performance – "Grace”
2010: Best Contemporary R&B Gospel Album – Still

GMA Dove Awards
1988: New Artist of the Year
1990: Group of the Year
1990: Pop/Contemporary Album – Heaven
1990: Pop/Contemporary Song – "Heaven”
1990: Contemporary Gospel Song – "With My Whole Heart”
1992: Group of the Year
1992: Contemporary Gospel Song – "Addictive Love”
1998: Contemporary Gospel Song – "Up Where We Belong”
2010: Urban Recorded Song – "Close To You”

NAACP Image awards
1990: Best Gospel Artist
1992: Best Gospel Artist

Soul Train Music Awards
1990: Best Gospel Album – Heaven
1992: Best Gospel Album – Different Lifestyles

The Walk of Fame Committee of the Hollywood Chamber of Commerce has announced that BeBe & CeCe Winans names will be added to the Hollywood Walk of Fame in 2011. The duo were inducted into the Black Music & Entertainment Walk of Fame in 2022.

Discography

Albums

Studio albums

Compilation albums

Singles

Music videos
 "Heaven"
 "Celebrate New Life"
 "Addictive Love"
 "I'll Take You There"
 "It's O.K."
 "Jingle Bells"
 "If Anything Ever Happened To You"
 "Love of My Life"
 "Feels Like Heaven (With You)"
 "Close To You" (Gospel No. 1, #38 R&B)

Popular culture influence
 One of the duo's signature songs, Heaven, was remade by Destiny's Child member Michelle Williams featuring Carl Thomas on her 2002 Gospel album Heart to Yours.
 In 1992, the duo made an appearance on Sesame Street in the song "Dancing Shoes", for which they provided the vocals.
 Both appear on the television series Martin on the episode titled "Go Tell It on the Martin" (1994).
 On the Disney Channel's animated television show The Proud Family, the youngest children in the family are twin toddlers named BeBe and CeCe.
Timothy Bowman Jr. and Deborah Joy Winans portrayed BeBe and Cece respectively in the 2015 Lifetime biopic Whitney.

Solo careers
In 1995, they officially parted ways to work on their solo careers and other areas of interest. Both artists have gone on to have successful solo careers, receiving numerous awards and accolades. To date, BeBe has released six solo albums, while CeCe has released twelve.

BeBe and CeCe Winans recorded twice as a duo during their hiatus (before reuniting for the 2009 album "Still") – "What A Child", a duet on CeCe's Christmas album His Gift, released in 1998, and "Tonight Tonight", a duet on BeBe's 2000 album Love & Freedom.

References

External links

Singers from Detroit
American gospel singers
Family musical groups
American gospel musical groups
Musical groups from Detroit
Musical groups established in 1982
1982 establishments in Michigan
Winans family
Ballad music groups